Étienne Durand was a French tennis player. He competed in the men's singles and doubles events at the 1900 Summer Olympics.

References

External links
 
 

Year of birth missing
Year of death missing
French male tennis players
Olympic tennis players of France
Tennis players at the 1900 Summer Olympics
Place of birth missing
Place of death missing